Just Another Photo Festival is an Indian photography festival, co-founded by Poulomi Basu and CJ Clarke in 2015. It aims to democratise access to visual media. The festival is not always held in the same location: 2015 in Delhi, 2016 in Varanasi, 2017 in Kolkata, and 2018 was scheduled to be held in Kolkata.

References

External links

Art festivals in India
Photography festivals